The Bradford Dragons are an English semi-professional basketball club based in Bradford, West Yorkshire. Founded in 2001, the Dragons currently compete in NBL Division 1, the second tier of the British basketball system.

Club history
The club was established in 2001 as a local under-16 club, in response to growing demand from local players for an outlet to play competitive basketball.  The club quickly attracted more young players, entering an under-18 team in the Bradford League for the 2002-03 season and adding an Under-21 team in 2003.  2004 saw further expansion, with under-14 and under-16 teams entering the national junior leagues for the first time.

The Dragons added senior men's basketball to their programme in 2005, entering into EBL Division Three North.  The team made a steady start to life in the National League, finishing in the top six in each of their first four seasons, narrowly missing out on the playoffs on several occasions.  In the 2009-10 season, the team won the first of two successive promotions, finishing the season at the top of Division Three (North) and making the post-season semi-finals.  A similar record in the 2010-11 season saw the Men's team promoted to NBL Division 1, where they have remained since.

A reserve team was entered in EBL Division Four (North) for the first time in 2011, with a women's team joining EBL Division Two (North) in the following season and claiming the title at their first attempt with a 13-2 record.  Despite this early success, both teams were disbanded after the 2012-13 season, although the club hopes to relaunch both teams into national competition in the future.

The club's importance to the local community was recognised in 2006 by Bradford Council, which awarded the Dragons a special commendation award for their contribution to community cohesion.

Players

Current squad

Notable former players

Season-by-season records

References

External links
Official Bradford Dragons website

Basketball teams in England